The following is a list of ecoregions in the Gabon, according to the Worldwide Fund for Nature (WWF).

Terrestrial ecoregions
by major habitat type

Tropical and subtropical moist broadleaf forests

 Atlantic Equatorial coastal forests
 Northwestern Congolian lowland forests

Tropical and subtropical grasslands, savannas, and shrublands

 Western Congolian forest–savanna mosaic

Mangroves

 Central African mangroves

Freshwater ecoregions
by bioregion

West Coastal Equatorial

 Central West Coastal Equatorial
 Southern West Coastal Equatorial

Marine ecoregions
 Gulf of Guinea Central

References
 Burgess, Neil, Jennifer D’Amico Hales, Emma Underwood (2004). Terrestrial Ecoregions of Africa and Madagascar: A Conservation Assessment. Island Press, Washington DC.
 Spalding, Mark D., Helen E. Fox, Gerald R. Allen, Nick Davidson et al. "Marine Ecoregions of the World: A Bioregionalization of Coastal and Shelf Areas". Bioscience Vol. 57 No. 7, July/August 2007, pp. 573–583.
 Thieme, Michelle L. (2005). Freshwater Ecoregions of Africa and Madagascar: A Conservation Assessment. Island Press, Washington DC.
 Toham, Andre Kamdem et al., eds. (2006). A Vision for Biodiversity Conservation in Central Africa: Biological Priorities for Conservation in the Guinean-Congolian Forest and Freshwater Region. World Wildlife Fund, Washington DC. Page A-52.

 
Gabon
Ecoregions